Facklamia tabacinasalis is a Gram-positive bacteria from the family of Facklamia which has been isolated from powdered tobacco.

References

External links
Type strain of Facklamia tabacinasalis at BacDive -  the Bacterial Diversity Metadatabase

Bacteria described in 1999
Lactobacillales